Keakealaniwahine (c. 1640-1695), was a High Chiefess and ruler Aliʻi Nui of Hawaii island.

Life
Her mother was Queen Keakamahana, monarch of Hawaii. Her father (and mother's cousin) was Chief Iwikau-i-kaua of Oahu. She became ruler of the island on the death of her mother. She and her mother are association with the massive royal complex built at Holualoa Bay on the west side of the island.

Her reign was a troubled one. The house of I had controlled the Hilo district since the days of their ancestor Prince Kumalae, the son of Umi-a-Liloa, had grown to such wealth and strength, and importance, as to be practically independent of even the very loose bonds with which the ruling district chiefs were held to their feudal obligations. The representative of this house of the district chief of Hilo at this time was Kuahuia, the son of Kua-ana-a-I, and grandson of I. What led to the war, or what were its incidents, has not been preserved in the oral records, but it is frequently alluded to as a long and bitter strife between Kuahuia and Keakealaniwahine; and though tradition is equally silent as to its conclusion, it may be inferred that the royal authority was unable to subdue its powerful vassal. Mahiolole, the powerful district chief of Kohala was the chief counselor and supporter of Keakealani.

She was married two times, first to her cousin, Chief Kanaloaikaiwilewa, or as he is called in some genealogies, Chief Kanaloa-i-Kaiwilena Kapulehu, son of Chief Umi-nui-kukailani, by his wife, Chiefess Kalani-o-Umi, daughter of Kaikilani, 17th Alii Aimoku of Hawaii. She married second her half-brother, Chief Kane-i-Kauaiwilani, son of her father, Chief Iwikauikaua, of Oahu, by his second wife, Kauakahi Kuaanaau-a-kane.

She had a son Keaweʻīkekahialiʻiokamoku by Kanaloa-i-Kaiwilena Kapulehu, who would succeed her as the 21st king of Hawaii. She died about 1695, having had two sons and two daughters. One of them was Queen Kalanikauleleiaiwi.

She was the great-great-grandmother of Kamehameha I through five different relationships.

References

Royalty of Hawaii (island)
1640s births
1690s deaths
Hawaiian queens regnant
House of Līloa
17th-century women rulers
17th-century monarchs in Oceania